The 2021–22 Georgetown Hoyas women's basketball team represents Georgetown University in the 2021–22 college basketball season. The Hoyas, led by fifth year head coach James Howard are members of the Big East Conference. The Hoyas play their home games at the McDonough Gymnasium.

Roster

Schedule

|-
!colspan=12 style=""| Regular season

|-
!colspan=12 style=""|Big East tournament

See also
2021–22 Georgetown Hoyas men's basketball team

References

Georgetown
Georgetown Hoyas women's basketball seasons
2021 in sports in Washington, D.C.
2022 in sports in Washington, D.C.